This is a list of flags used in Italy. For more information about the national flag, visit the article Flag of Italy.

National flags

Military flags

Army rank flags

Naval rank flags

Standards

Historical flags

Roman Empire

Preunification era

Napoleonic era

Unification and Kingdom of Italy

Italian Republic

Regional flags

Official regional flags

Ordinary regions

Autonomous regions

Other

Flags of traditional and historical regions

Proposed regional flags

Provincial flags

Municipal flags

Political flags

Ethnic groups flags

House flags

Citations

References
 

Italy
 
Flags